Sasda may refer to:
 South African Sheepdog Association or SASDA
 Sasda, a clan of the Bharwad people of India